Helpmate is an American old-time radio soap opera. It was broadcast on NBC from September 22, 1941, until June 30, 1944.

Format
In his book, Frank and Anne Hummert's Radio Factory: The Programs and Personalities of Broadcasting's Most Prolific Producers, radio historian Jim Cox wrote that Helpmate focused on the lives of three couples who were neighbors: Linda and Steve Harper, Grace and Clyde Marshall, and Holly and George Emerson. A Chicago Tribune news item previewing the program described the show as "the story of an unselfish woman who sacrifices much to advance the musical career of the man in whom she believes".

Personnel
Characters in Helpmate and the actors who portrayed them are shown in the table below.

Frank and Anne Hummert were the producers; Margaret Lewerth was the writer.

References 
 

1941 radio programme debuts
1944 radio programme endings
1940s American radio programs
NBC radio programs
American radio soap operas